Alabagrus is a genus of braconid wasps in the family Braconidae. There are at least 100 described species in Alabagrus.

See also
 List of Alabagrus species

References

Further reading

External links

 
 

Parasitic wasps